PINK de Thierry (born Helena Scheerder, 1943) is a Dutch visual artist known for her meta-performance art projects, which included 100 days of living in a painting (At Home, 1984), 30 days of traveling in the US as a performance-art project in 1988, daily entering Arcadia for 60 days in Germany with Et in Arcadia Ego Sum in 1990–91 and leading the Royal Netherlands Army in constructing Checkpoint to Dutch Arcadia in 1994. Since 1995, she has created a series of works entitled Letters from Arcadia.

Early years

Belgium, 1963–1971

PINK, began her career as a stage and film actress  in Brussels under the name of Helen Pinck and or Helen Pink. She trained with the experimental Living Theatre when it presented Frankenstein in Brussels, Jerzy Grotowski's protégé André Desrameaux and Yoshi Oida at Peter Brook's International Centre for Theatre Research in Paris.
During her time in Brussels PINK was influenced by designer-artist Raphaël Opstaele, poet Marcel van Maele, poet and visual artist Marcel Broodthaers (in whose vernissage of his Musée d'Art Moderne, Département les Aigles she participated at his home in Brussels in 1968) and architect Jef de Groote.

In the autumn of 1968, the Laboratory of Theatrical Research at Louvain University commissioned André Desrameaux and PINK to create an experimental theatre piece. The resulting performance, Erektion, used text and vocalization by actors on a multi-level, wire-mesh stage over the audience. Erektion began a new art group, Mass Moving, which focused on art in public spaces.

Participating in a performance artwork by James Lee Byars in the Wide White Space Gallery (Antwerp) in 1969 moved PINK toward the visual arts. Utrecht cultural deputy Jan Juffermans commissioned PINK, Opstaele and De Groote (who became Mass Moving) to create an outdoor event in the city center. The result, Motion (1969), was Mass Moving's first art intervention in an outdoor public space. A number of art-intervention projects on the scale of city life were created in public spaces in Europe, Africa and Japan. In January 1976, at the end of the Sound Stream project, Mass Moving disbanded.

Travels and return to the Netherlands, 1972–1980

After Mass Moving's Ludic Environment Machine (L.E.M.) project for the Sonsbeek Buiten De Perken outdoor art festival in Arnhem and the Butterfly Project (Venice Biennale, 1972), PINK left Mass Moving and settled in the Netherlands. From 1972 to 1980, she worked on performance works with and for postgraduate students and professionals in a number of fields.
During this period the artist traveled to West Africa to research local rituals, studied Japanese theater with Yoshi Oida at Peter Brook's Centre International de Recherche Théâtrale in Paris and witnessed ancient rituals by Motohisa Yamakage in Japan.

Performance art

L'Art du Bonheur: Man Woman Child series, 1980–1990

From 1980 to 1995 PINK created a number of intervention-based meta-performance-art projects and, consequently, her handling of performance art is well revealed in the talk she has held in 2011 about the genesis of her performance-installation artwork "Ter Zake. Business as Usual, USA 1988". in which an iconic human unit, Man Woman Child (MWC), was used as a metaphor for humanity's cultural transference. For each project, PINK explored a theme with a mixture of public-space art intervention and performance, installation, photo and video art.
Large, official royal-portrait photographs remain from the exhibit.

In 1981's East West Home Is Best MWC lived for 30 days in a specially built, fully furnished suburban apartment inside a Holland Festival art exhibition in Amsterdam, where 30,000 visitors filed through as MWC lived their lives.

VideoSketchBook (1983) found MWC living one day apiece in 12 row houses on a 1930s street in a provincial capital. PINK adapted this performance piece into a video installation of 12 photo and 13 film portraits at Frans Hals Museum Haarlem, Vleeshal Middelburg, MMK-Arnhem, SALA I Roma, Fotofeis Edinburgh, and Galerija Klovic Zagreb. The Rijksmuseum in Amsterdam acquired in her KOG collection the complete video-installation with the 12 original photoprints from 1983 which was celebrated December 17, 2018 with a KOG lecture by prof. dr. Erik de Jong on Videosketchbook 1983: The Ritual of Hominess.

At Home (1984) considered MWC the ideal family in Haarlem, Bergen and Middelburg (Frans Hals Museum Haarlem, KCB Bergen. Vleeshal Middelburg.), which hosted them for 100 days in their city centers in an ideal garden against a backdrop of a full-scale painting of an ideal house (sleeping in a camper bus behind the 100-m2 exhibit).

Tea Time (1986) was a VPRO television project in which MWC explored the ritual of a filmed tea party, a conversation piece with a prominent family ending in an official group portrait.

HouseRites in Crystal Museum (1987) revealed humankind's affectionate and possessive relationship with personal objects at home, set in the context of museum-art conservation. Dutch National Arts Council.

In Ter Zake. Business as Usual. USA 1988, a government-sponsored orientation trip to the United States turned into a 30-day performance artwork. MOCA, Los Angeles and Stedelijk Museum, Amsterdam.

In Standing Stone (1989), with an ice-age boulder their only luggage MWC walked to the intersection of the Saalien lateral moraine and the actual North Sea coast. The travelers (and their -ton luggage) stayed overnight at the Haarlem Frans Halsmuseum. When they arrived at their destination the following day MWC stood, motionless, on top of the boulder. The boulder is on exhibit in front of PINK's former studio at Overtoom nr. 16 in Amsterdam.

In Electronic Painting at the 1990 "Tomorrow is Yesterday" exhibition at Museum Het Prinsenhof in Delft, a white-gloved chief curator replaced a painting of the Holy Family (c. 1500, unknown master) by a beautifully framed photo of MWC at their 1989 overnight stay in the Frans Hals Museum. A video of the Holy Family painting was shown on a monitor in an open safe; after visiting hours, the safe was locked.

Entering Arcadia, 1990–1995

In 1990–91's Et in Arcadia Ego Sum, a smartly-dressed MWC entered Arcadia daily for two months. Arcadia was a large room with a half-open door in the center, bordered by four enlarged (50 x) Lego-type trees and flowers, in Rheinisches Landesmuseum Bonn and Kunsthaus Hamburg respectively.

In 1992's Direction Arcadia, under a road sign pointing to アルカヂア (Arcadia) MWC stranded with luggage at a crowded intersection in Shinjuku, Tokyo.

The installation artwork Bateaux pour l'Arcadie III, featuring a ferry carrying the ashes of PINK's studio works, some other leftovers and a safe with an eternal flame, was exhibited at the Van Reekum Museum (presently Coda Art Museum) in Apeldoorn in 1993 and in the Vleeshal of the Frans Halsmuseum in 1998.

Checkpoint to Dutch Arcadia (1994) was a performance-art project in which PINK commanded the Royal Netherlands Army in a two-week campaign to close a portion of a -long, century-old dike built to withstand any future attack on Amsterdam. With 200 truckloads of sand and 30,000 sandbags, the Royal Engineers and Infantry (led by PINK) filled the opening. At noon daily, PINK addressed the men about the artwork and its purpose. An official road sign said "Welcome to Dutch Arcadia" and "See You Again in Arcadia" in the languages of occupiers of the Netherlands (now EU member states) and immigrants expelled from the Netherlands during the 1990s.

More art

Beyond Language: Letters from Arcadia (since 1995)

As PINK was struck by the impossibility of expressing essentials in words, she started scripting her stories in disordered alphabets on canvas. Her paintings Letters from Arcadia (ongoing) are in fountain pen on canvas or palimpsest.  Letters to Family, an ongoing cycle of art works and installations, are communications with those PINK regards as close relatives and soulmates who live on in museums and libraries (such as Samuel Beckett, Franz Kafka, Velimir Khlebnikov, James Lee Byars, Louis-Ferdinand Céline, Joseph Beuys, Piet Mondriaan, Kazimir Malevich, Marcel Broodthaers, Alberto Giacometti and The Unknown Artist). Letters from the Ferryman (2001) is a series of double portraits of strangers (painted and written). Encyclopedia Arcadia (begun 2001) is a series of books: Passions, Scripts, Prayers, Alchemy, Scriptures, Omens, Scores, Discoveries, Torn Mirages and Inventories. Blanchir l'Histoire (2002–2007) is a cycle of eight paintings,  each, in which PINK explores the roots of the written word from Sumerian to Hebrew. In LOT of PINK (2007), the artist explores "lot" in a project where people buy a numbered artwork derived from Standing Stone with the possibility of winning a second work. Satellite View on Arcadia (begun 2008) is a series of collage paintings, with torn, thin blotting paper fixed on canvas with oil paint.

Since 2010: Data Processing in art and thence

Documented Documents (2010–2011) is an overview of her oeuvre, a series of 120 collage works on paper from leftovers out of her archives with text comments in her handwritings. Portrait of Ernst Gombrich – Où est l'Original, d'après MB - (2011–2012) is a series of collage paintings exploring the original and its copy, based on Ernst Gombrich's Story of Art. Torn Mirages (2012–2013) are collage works on paper consisting of torn (former) drawings with text references. Inventories, Part X of the series Encyclopaedia Arcadia is finished in 2013; 40 graphic samples of lists meet torn images from Gombrich's historic art overview. Data Parade (2014-2015) is a series of 24 paintings dealing with the increased use of processed data in numbers, graphics and lists determinant in articles, views and opinions in all media. PINK recreates her life and work in Bio-Graphics (2016-2017), a series of 74 drawings in graphic text on paper.

Museum exhibitions
Vleeshal, Middelburg 1983 (solo) VideoSketchBook (solo)
Frans Hals Museum, Haarlem 1984 VideoSketchBook & At Home, 1989 Back At Home, 1998 Nieuw Werk van PINK (all solo)
Museum Moderne Kunst, Arnhem 1986 and 1989 VideoSketchBook, 2004 VideoSketchBook, 2015 VideoSketchBook

Stedelijk Museum, Amsterdam 1989 PINK WORKS 1981 - 1988 (solo)
LVR-LandesMuseum, Bonn 1990 Et in Arcadia Ego Sum in: "Schräg"
Kunsthaus, Hamburg 1991 Et in Arcadia Ego Sum in: "Schräg"
CODA Museum, Apeldoorn 1993 Bateaux pour l'Arcadie III in: "Papier Persé"

Performance projects
Holland Festival, Amsterdam 1981 East West Home is Best in: "Kitsch uit de Kunst"
Frans Hals Museum, Haarlem 1984 At Home & VideoSketchBook, 1989, Standing Stone (overnight stay)
KCB, Bergen 1984 At Home
Vleeshal, Middelburg 1984 At Home in: "De Gentse Collectie"
VPRO Dutch broadcasting company 1986 TeaTime
Museum of Contemporary Art, Los Angeles 1988 Ter Zake. Business as Usual. USA 1988
Stedelijk Museum, Amsterdam 1989 Ter Zake. Business as Usual. USA 1988 (first unrolling in Europe) in: "PINK WORKS"
Museum Het Prinsenhof, Delft 1990 Electronic Painting in: "To-Morrow is Yesterday"
Rheinisches Landesmuseum, Bonn 1990 Et in Arcadia Ego Sum in: "Schräg" 
Kunsthaus, Hamburg 1991 Et in Arcadia Ego Sum in: "Schräg"
Hoofddorp, Stelling van Amsterdam 1994, Royal Netherlands Army, Checkpoint to Dutch Arcadia in: "Doorbroken Lijn"

Notes and references

Notes

References

External links
 

 
 
PINK de Thierry at the RKD database

1943 births
Living people
Dutch conceptual artists
Dutch contemporary artists
Dutch performance artists
Artists from Haarlem